This is a list of singles that peaked in the Top 10 of the Billboard Hot 100 during 2006.

Chris Brown scored four top ten hits during the year with "Run It!", "Yo (Excuse Me Miss)", "Say Goodbye", and "Shortie Like Mine", the most among all other artists.

Top-ten singles
Key
 – indicates single's top 10 entry was also its Hot 100 debut
 – indicates Best performing song of the year
(#) – 2006 year-end top 10 single position and rank

2005 peaks

2007 peaks

See also
 2006 in music
 List of Hot 100 number-one singles of 2006 (U.S.)
 Billboard Year-End Hot 100 singles of 2006

References

General sources

Joel Whitburn Presents the Billboard Hot 100 Charts: The 2000s
Additional information obtained can be verified within Billboard's online archive services and print editions of the magazine.

2006
United States Hot 100 Top 10